Karluk was an American-built brigantine which, after many years' service as a whaler, was acquired by the Canadian government in 1913 to act as flagship to the Canadian Arctic Expedition. While on her way to the expedition's rendezvous at Herschel Island, Karluk became trapped in the Arctic pack ice and, after drifting for several months, was crushed and sank in January 1914. Of the 25 aboard (crew and expedition staff), eleven died, either during the attempts to reach land by marching over the ice, or after arrival at the temporary refuge of Wrangel Island.

Ship history
Karluk was built in 1884, at Matthew Turner's shipyard, Benicia, California, as a tender for the Alaska salmon fishery industry (karluk is the Alutiiq word for "fish"). In 1892 Karluk was converted for use as a whaler, when her bows and sides were sheathed with  Australian ironwood. She completed 14 whaling trips, the last of which was in 1911.

For her role in the Canadian Arctic Expedition, Karluk had been acquired by expedition leader Vilhjalmur Stefansson in 1913 for the bargain price of $10,000, and sold at cost to the Canadian government when it assumed overall responsibility for the expedition.  Robert Bartlett, appointed Karluks captain for the expedition, was concerned about the ship's fitness for the task, believing that she had not been built to withstand sustained ice pressure, and that she lacked the engine power to force a passage through the ice.
Even after refitting, the engine had a habit of breaking down. Karluks chief engineer, John Munro, described it as a "coffee pot of an engine...never [i]ntended to run more than two days at a time."

Designation

Several designations have been applied to the ship after her acquisition by the Canadian government, including "HMCS" (His Majesty's Canadian Ship), "DGS" (Dominion Government Ship), and "CGS" (Canadian Government Ship). It is not clear whether the "HMCS" designation was formal or informal; HMCS is used for Royal Canadian Navy ships. Although Karluk sailed under a civilian captain and crew, she flew the Canadian Blue Ensign, the jack of the Royal Canadian Navy.

There is also a great deal to support the application of the "CGS" designation. Furthermore, the other principal ship of the expedition,  carried the "CGS" designation.

Last voyage

Karluk sailed from Nome, Alaska on 13 July 1913, heading for Herschel Island where she was to meet up with the expedition's other vessels. On 19 September Stefansson and other members of the expedition staff left the ship for a ten-day hunting trip. While they were gone the ice, carrying Karluk with it, began to drift more rapidly westward, so that Stefansson and his party were unable to return to the ship. They made their way overland to Cape Smythe, near Point Barrow. Karluk continued drifting, under constant dangers from the pressures of the ice. On 10 January 1914 she was holed; she took on water steadily and sank the next day. All 25 persons aboard – crew, expedition staff and Inuit hunters – transferred to the ice. After several weeks in a temporary ice camp they began efforts to reach the nearest land, Wrangel Island. An advance party of four lost their way on the march and were found dead on Herald Island years later. Another party of four, including British explorer James Murray, detached themselves from the expedition and attempted to reach land independently; they were never seen again. Of the 17 who reached the island, three died before rescue arrived in September 1914.

See also

Canadian Arctic Expedition 1913–16

References

Sources
 (search ship "Karluk")

Brigantines
Whaling ships
Alaska-related ships
Steamships of Canada
Arctic exploration vessels
Shipwrecks in the Arctic Ocean
Maritime incidents in January 1914
Ships built in Benicia, California
1884 ships
Nome, Alaska
Auxiliary ships of the Royal Canadian Navy
Canadian Government Ship